Saidels Bakery (now named Saidel Jewish Baking Center - S.J.B.C) was the first true artisan bakery in Israel. Established by Les and Sheryl Saidel in 2008 and located in the Samarian village of Karnei Shomron, the bakery was originally opened to fill a need for fresh-baked, authentic, artisan and organic healthy Jewish bread.

Its center of operation is the only Ovencrafters designed brick oven in the Middle East, in which all baked products - artisan breads, organic health breads and pastry, are manufactured using ancient artisan methods. The bakery is also notable as the only bakery in the country that grinds its own stone ground organic whole grain flour, using a vintage stone mill.

The Saidel Jewish Baking Center is most noted however for its exclusive , (also known as Rambam Bread), a health bread that is baked using a unique process, based on the writings of the scholar and physician Maimonides, which reduces the gluten quantity of the bread.

Pioneering the dissemination of knowledge about healthy, artisan baking in Israel, the bakery expanded to become what is now the Saidel Jewish Baking Center (S.J.B.C), a center for training, consulting, conducting exhibitions and demonstrations on anything related to Jewish bread, artisan baking, health and nutrition. The S.J.B.C also offers consulting services, provides lectures and tours for groups or individuals and is instrumental in raising the awareness of the benefits of healthy, old-world style artisan baking.

Method of Sale 

In April 2011 the bakery opened an International Department which allows relatives and friends from all over the world to send their loved ones in Israel a healthy "taste of home", gift baskets, challot, apple pies and more.

Appearances in the media 

The  reviewed Saidels bakery in a feature article in its October 30, 2008 edition.

 featured an interview with Les Saidel in July 2009 during the Independence Day AACI Fair in Jerusalem.

On November 16, 2011 the Israeli daily  ran an article on Saidels Bakery (English translation ).

On March 2, 2012 the  published an article about Saidel's Hamantaschen (a traditional delicacy eaten on the Jewish festival of Purim).

The Israeli radio station  ran a 40-minute interview with Les Saidel on April 11, 2013 in the 6:00pm spot.

Israel TV's  featured an interview with Les Saidel on the program Ba'im Leshabat, April 26, 2013.

The  featured an article about Les Saidel on May 16, 2013.

In May 2013 Les Saidel began freelancing as a columnist for the Israeli newspaper  in the Weekend supplement, a column entitled "In The Grain", on the subjects of baking, health and nutrition.

Read an interview with Les Saidel in Israel's  newspaper (in English) from December 5, 2013

References 

 Israelity Blog, Nabbing the Elusive Rye, https://web.archive.org/web/20120401144207/http://israelity.com/tag/saidel-bakery/
 Telfed Magazine article, August 2010, http://saidels.com/telfedarticle082010.gif
 Maariv daily newspaper, November 16, 2011, http://www.nrg.co.il/online/16/ART2/293/734.html?hp=16&cat=1901&loc=11
 Haaretz Herald Tribune, March 2, 2012, http://www.haaretz.com/weekend/anglo-file/south-african-immigrant-brings-israel-the-traditional-purim-pastry-of-his-youth-1.416005
 Mekor Rishon newspaper, April 6, 2013, http://saidels.com/mekorrishon.htm
 Arutz Sheva Radio, April 11, 2013, http://www.israelnationalnews.com/Radio/Player.aspx#0#4607
 Israel TV's Arutz 2 Channel, Ba'im Leshabat, April 26, 2013, https://www.youtube.com/watch?v=RevU_fNpITE
 Jerusalem Post newspaper, Weekend supplement, May 16, 2013, http://www.jpost.com/Food-Index/Baking-Class-The-bread-winners-313618
 Hamodia newspaper, December 5, 2013, http://saidels.com/hamodiaarticle.pdf

External links 
 Saidels Bakery website  
 Maimonides Bread website 
 Showbread Institute website 

Food and drink companies of Israel
Food and drink companies established in 2008